The Highland derby is a football rivalry that is based in the Scottish Highlands. It is contested between the only two full-time SPFL clubs in the Highland council area, Inverness Caledonian Thistle and Ross County. The fixture is the most northerly professional football derby in the UK.

History
The rivalry first arose in 1994, when Caledonian Thistle (whose name did not yet include the city) were formed out of the merger between Caledonian and Inverness Thistle. Both the new Inverness club and Ross County had been accepted as new teams into the Scottish Football League, starting a trend of Highland League clubs entering the SFL. The first match between the sides was a Third Division contest, played on 27 August 1994 at Victoria Park, won 3–1 by Inverness.

Since that historic first match, the encounter has gone from strength to strength as both teams improved and came to compete near the top of the Scottish football league system. Both have significant fanbases that have grown due to their successes since their inclusion in 1994. Attendances at the derby matches often surpass the 5,000 mark, making the match itself a popular attraction. The clubs met in the top flight of Scottish football for the first time during the 2012–13 Scottish Premier League season. For a few months in 2016, the Highland clubs were simultaneously the holders of the country's two major cups, with Inverness's triumph in the 2015 Scottish Cup Final followed by Ross County's win in the 2016 Scottish League Cup Final (March).

The increased level of media interest in the fixture led some outlets to humorously tag the derby as "El Kessocko" (a pun on Spanish El Clásico) or "The Cold Firm" (a pun on the Old Firm).

The relationship between the clubs is unusual in that there is "a level of goodwill" between them. For example, both clubs closely co-operate in the Highland Football Academy.

Head-to-head
In head-to-head matches, the teams have played each other in 62 games, with Inverness Caledonian Thistle winning 27 times, compared to Ross County's 17. A total of 18 matches have ended in a draw. Inverness have won more league, Scottish Cup and Challenge Cup matches, with the teams tied in League Cup matches.

Matches played
League

Cups

Goalscorer records
Players with 3 or more goals in the Highland derby.

Managerial records
As of 2 April 2021. Minimum 5 Highland Derby games as manager.

Notable players and managers of both clubs
A number of players have played for both clubs. Craig Brewster is a former player and manager of ICT who then played for and coached Ross County. John Robertson and John Hughes have had spells as manager at both clubs.

Among the players who have featured for both sides are:

 Andrew Barrowman 
 Graham Bayne 
 Mark Brown
 Joe Chalmers
 Alex Cooper 
 Don Cowie 
 Lionel Djebi-Zadi 
 Coll Donaldson 
 Ross Draper 
 Russell Duncan
 Michael Fraser 
 Les Fridge
 Stuart Golabek 
 Richie Hart 
 Richard Hastings
 Steven Hislop 
 Roy McBain
 Mark McCulloch
 Billy McKay
 Gary McSwegan
 Alan Morgan
 Grant Munro 
 John Rankin 
 Antonio Reguero
 Mark Ridgers
 Hugh Robertson
 Greg Tansey
 Ross Tokely 
 Lewis Toshney
 Carl Tremarco
 Iain Vigurs 
 Nicky Walker
 Steven Watt
 Jordan White
 Barry Wilson
 Garry Wood

Clubs' honours
These are the football honours of Inverness Caledonian Thistle and Ross County since they joined the Scottish League in 1994–95: 

These are the football honours of Caledonian, Inverness Thistle  and Ross County until they joined the Scottish League in 1994–95:

References

External links
All-time matches between Inverness CT and Ross County at Soccerbase

Scotland football derbies
Inverness Caledonian Thistle F.C.
Ross County F.C.
Football in Highland (council area)
Recurring sporting events established in 1994